Orthotylus globiceps is a species of bug in the Miridae family that is endemic to Spain.

References

Insects described in 1976
Endemic fauna of Spain
Hemiptera of Europe
globiceps